Irene Güdel (born 7 July 1930 in Aegerten) is a Swiss cellist. From 1957 to 1995 she taught the cello at the Hochschule für Musik Detmold, since 1969 as professor. volumes 37–38, Verlag Merseburger 1986, .

Life 
She has given concerts in Europe, South America and Japan and has been invited by German and Swiss radio stations to make solo and chamber music recordings. From 1953 to 1965 she was a member of the Strub Quartet in Detmold.

Recordings 
Vinzenz Lachner – Kammermusik und Klavierwerke, Antes (Bella Musica).
 Carl Philipp Emanuel Bach (1714–1788), Cello Concerto in B flat Major / Georg Philipp Telemann, Suite in B flat Major (Carlos Kleiber/ ), Profil.

Publications 
 Jost Michaels/Irene Güdel: Ferdinand Ries (1784–1838), Sonata in G minor op.125 for violoncello and piano. Ries & Erler, Berlin 1984, 
 Jost Michaels/Irene Güdel: Vinzenz Lachner, 6 pièces caractéristiques: No. 1–4. Schott, Mainz 1989.
 Jost Michaels/Irene Güdel: Vinzenz Lachner, 6 pièces caractéristiques: No. 5–6. Schott, Mainz 1989.
 Jost Michaels/Irene Güdel: Peter von Winter, Concertino in E flat major for clarinet, violoncello and orchestra. Sikorski, Hamburg 2005.

Prizes and awards 
 First prize of the Conservatoire de Paris, 1952
 Studienpreis des Schweizerischer Tonkünstlerverein 1952 Atlantis Verlag, 1975, 
 , 1954
 Support prize of the ARD International Music Competition, 1954

References

External links 
 
 Magazin.klassik.com, retrieved 27 July 2020
 

1930 births
Living people
People from Bern
Swiss cellists
Women cellists